Hukerd (also Romanized as Hūkerd and Hookerd; also known as Hījerd-e Bālā, Hījerd-e Pā’īn, Hūjerd, and Hūke) is a village in Khatunabad Rural District, in the Central District of Jiroft County, Kerman Province, Iran. At the 2006 census, its population was 1,833, in 420 families.

References 

Populated places in Jiroft County